Potter's Clay is a 1922 British silent drama film directed by H. Grenville-Taylor and Douglas Payne and starring Ellen Terry, Dick Webb, and Peggy Hathaway.

Cast
 Ellen Terry as Lady Merrall  
 Dick Webb as Clifford Merrall  
 Peggy Hathaway as Hypatia Dalroy  
 Douglas Payne as Henry J. Smith  
 Wallace Bosco as Louis 
 Gertrude Sterroll as Felicity  
 Henry Doughty as Mr. Dalroy

References

Bibliography
 Low, Rachael. History of the British Film, 1918-1929. George Allen & Unwin, 1971.

External links
 

1922 films
1922 drama films
British drama films
British silent feature films
British black-and-white films
1920s English-language films
1920s British films
Silent drama films